Luke Eves (born 11 April 1989 in Bristol, England) is a rugby union player who currently plays for Hartpury College in the RFU Championship. He plays as a centre.  He has Premiership experience with Bristol as well as Newcastle Falcons.  His father is former Bristol Rugby captain, Derek Eves. His son is called Charlie Eves

Career History 

Luke started his career with hometown club Bristol.  As well as playing club rugby he also has international experience, captaining the England U20 side which reached the final of the Junior World Championship in June 2009.  Eves signed for Newcastle from Bristol towards the end of the 2009/10 season, with the signing being announced the day after Bristol lost to Exeter in the Championship final. He returned to Bristol in January 2012   In 2015 he signed for Hartpury College.

Season-by-season playing stats

Honours and records 

England U-20
Team captain: 2009
World Rugby Under 20 Championship runners up: 2009

Notes

References

External links
Bristol Rugby profile

1989 births
Living people
English rugby union players
People educated at Colston's School
Hartpury University R.F.C. players
Rugby union players from Bristol
Rugby union centres